Venla was a Finnish television award. It was awarded annually between 1982 and 2010, after which it was replaced by the Golden Venla gala and award.

The drama and entertainment judges award prizes in eleven categories. Yleisövenla ("Public Venla") is selected by the public. Additionally both kinds of judges may award a Special Venla. Thus, 12–14 Venlas are awarded every year, often 13.

The five biggest Finnish television channels take part in the event: Yle TV1, Yle TV2, MTV3, Nelonen, and Yle Fem. 

The Venla Gala is arranged every January by one of the partaking channels.

Categories
Best drama series
Best television film
Best drama director
Best drama script
Best female actor
Best male actor
Best comedy series
Best music series
Best performer
Best entertainment show
Best game show
Public Venla
Special Venla

Finnish television awards